Strange Planet is a 1999 Australian comedy directed by Emma-Kate Croghan and starring Claudia Karvan. It was Croghan's follow up to Love and Other Catastrophes and used many of the same cast and crew.

Plot
The film explores the lives of three male friends and three female friends over the course of one year. Judy has an affair with her married boss. Sally is a party girl open to all experiences. Alice is morally strict but feels stuck.

Ewan is a lawyer who hates the law. Joel is left by his wife. Neil is desperate for love.

Cast
Claudia Karvan as Judy
Naomi Watts as Alice
Alice Garner as Sally
Tom Long as Ewan
Aaron Jeffery as Joel
Gennie Nevinson as Therapist
Felix Williamson as Neil
Hugo Weaving
Rebecca Firth

Production
At one stage it was planned that the film would be shot at the same time as another movie, Revolver which would be directed by Emma Kate Crogan while Stavros Kazantzidis would make Strange Planet. However, in the end Crogan directed Planet and Revolver was never made.

Reception
The film was a commercial disappointment and as of 2019 Croghan has not directed another feature film.

References

External links

Strange Planet at Oz Movies

Strange Planet at Urban Cinefile
Review at Variety
Review at SBS Movie Show

Australian comedy films
1990s English-language films
1990s Australian films